The Chorus Girl's Romance is a 1920 American silent comedy film directed by William C. Dowlan and starring Viola Dana, Gareth Hughes and William Quinn. It is based on the 1920 short story "Head and Shoulders" by F. Scott Fitzgerald.

Cast
 Viola Dana as Marcia Meadows
 Gareth Hughes as Horace Tarbox
 Phil Ainsworth as Steve Reynolds
 William Quinn as P.P. Anderson
 Jere Sundin as Betty Darrell
 Sidney De Gray as Fred Ward
 Lawrence Grant as Jose Brasswine
 Tom Gallery as Charlie Moon
 Edward Jobson as Dr. Tarbox
 Martin Best as F.W. Jordon
 Anne Schaefer as Aunt Emma
 Dorothy Gordon as Miss Wilson
 William V. Mong as Professor Dillinger

References

Bibliography
 Goble, Alan. The Complete Index to Literary Sources in Film. Walter de Gruyter, 1999.

External links
 

1920 films
1920 comedy films
1920s English-language films
American silent feature films
Silent American comedy films
American black-and-white films
Films directed by William C. Dowlan
Metro Pictures films
1920s American films